Bucculatrix splendida is a moth in the family Bucculatricidae. It was described by Svetlana Seksjaeva in 1992. It is found in Japan (Hokkaido, Honshu) and the Russian Far East.

The wingspan is about 8 mm. The forewings are fuscous brown and the hindwings are grey.

The larvae feed on Artemisia princeps. They mine the leaves of their host plant. The young larvae form a linear mine. Older larvae feed externally, peeling away and rolling up the lower epidermis, eating irregular patches of leaf tissue. Pupation takes place in a white cocoon.

References

Natural History Museum Lepidoptera generic names catalog

Bucculatricidae
Moths described in 1992
Moths of Japan
Moths of Asia